Zaur Saidovich Tarba (born 14 May 2003) is a Russian football player of Abkhazian descent who plays for FC Alania Vladikavkaz.

Club career
He made his debut in the Russian Premier League for PFC CSKA Moscow on 15 May 2022 in a game against FC Krasnodar.

On 18 August 2022, Tarba moved to FC Alania Vladikavkaz.

Personal life
His father Said Tarba also played football professionally. His brother Lev Tarba plays for FC Nart Sukhum in Abkhazian Premier League.

Career statistics

References

External links
 
 
 
 

2003 births
Russian people of Abkhazian descent
Living people
Russian footballers
Association football midfielders
PFC CSKA Moscow players
Russian Premier League players
Russian First League players